Central Hillside is a neighborhood in Duluth, Minnesota, United States; located directly uphill from the city's downtown.  The neighborhood offers views of the city and lake.

Duluth's Mesaba Avenue (Highway 194) travels through the Central Hillside neighborhood.  Many residents consider the area west of Mesaba Avenue to be the Observation Hill neighborhood, which is not included on official city maps.

Mesaba Avenue, Lake Avenue, and Fourth Street are three of the main routes in the community.

Central Hillside has notable architectural gems, including the Sacred Heart Center on Fourth Street.

Buckingham Creek flows through the neighborhood near 12th Avenue West.

Demographics

Race and ethnicity 
 White	76.6%
 Black or African American	7.4%
 American Indian and Alaskan Native 4.7%
 Asian or Pacific Islander alone 2.0%
 Two or more races	6.9%
 Hispanic or Latino 2.5%

Languages 
Primary language spoken at home:
 English only 93.4%
 Other 6.6%
 Speaks English less than "very well" 1.8%

Education 
 Less than high school	11.5%
 High school diploma or GED 23.7%
 Some college or associate’s degree 33.7%
 Bachelor's Degree	22.4%
 Graduate or professional degree 8.7%
 High school graduate or higher 88.5%
 Bachelor's degree or higher 31.1%

Adjacent Neighborhoods 

(Directions following those of Duluth's general street grid system, not actual geographical coordinates)

East Hillside (east)
Downtown Duluth (south)
Duluth Heights (north)
Lincoln Park (west)

External links and references
City of Duluth website
City map of neighborhoods (PDF)

See also
Duluth, Minnesota
Mesaba Avenue – State Highway 194 (MN 194)

References

Duluth–Superior metropolitan area
Neighborhoods in Duluth, Minnesota